Alexander Appolonovich Manuilov (April 3, 1861 in Odessa – July 20, 1929 in Moscow) was a Russian economist and politician. He was one of the founding members of the Constitutional Democratic party (known as the Kadets) and was the Rector of Moscow State University between 1908 and 1911.

He was the Minister of Education in the first Provisional Government and from 1924 was in the central administration of Gosbank, the Soviet state bank.

Sources 
Izvestia Article & Notes
Photograph & Notes (in Russian)

1861 births
1929 deaths
Ministers of the Russian Provisional Government
Economists from Moscow
Academic staff of Moscow State University
Rectors of Moscow State University
Economists from the Russian Empire
Soviet economists
Russian Constitutional Democratic Party members
People from Odesa